Nidogen-2, also known as osteonidogen, is a basal lamina protein of the nidogen family. It was the second nidogen to be described after nidogen-1 (entactin).  Both play key roles during late embryonic development. In humans it is encoded by the NID2 gene.

References

Further reading 

 
 
 
 
 
 
 
 

Extracellular matrix proteins
Genes on human chromosome 14